Mario Trabucco (Leivi, Italy) is an Italian violinist.

Biography 
Mario Trabucco since 1972 is the curator-violinist of the historical violin the "Cannone"  of Guarneri del Gesù belonged to Niccolò Paganini, and its copy the "Sivori" by Jean-Baptiste Vuillaume. With the "Cannone" he has been performing abroad: Hanoi, Santiago de Compostela, Tokyo, St. Petersburg and the European Parliament in Strasbourg.

Mario Trabucco graduated from the Conservatory Niccolò Paganini of Genoa with the Mario Ruminelli. He received the Diploma of Merit from the Chigiana Music Academy in the high specialization violin course held by Salvatore Accardo and Riccardo Brengola (Siena, 1970).

He has performed many concerts as a soloist in Rome, Florence, Genoa etc.

He was concertmaster of the Opera Theatre of Rome, the Comunal Theatre of Florence, the Carlo Felice Theatre of Genoa, the Orchestra of Italian Switzerland and the Orchestra of St. Cecilia in Rome.

Until 2015 he was professor of violin at the Conservatory Niccolò Paganini of Genoa.

Among his students:

-Giulio Plotino - winner of the First Prize at the Competition "Premio Città di Vittorio Veneto" in 1999 and the 4° (Fourth) Prize ex æquo in the Competition

"Premio Paganini" (Genoa, 2002).

-Oleksandr Pushkarenko - 5° (Fifth) Prize winner of the 55th International Violin Competition “Premio Paganini” (Genoa, Italy, 2018), Winner at "XII Premio Nazionale delle Arti", special prize dedicated to the memory of Leonardo and Ludovica Tulli offered by the National Police Officers Association (Genoa, Italy, 2017), Absolute winner at XXVII  International Competition of Musical Interpretation (Genoa, 2015), 2nd prize winner at Competition "Premio Claudio Abbado" ex "Premio delle Arti", section violin (Bergamo, Italy, 2015), 3rd prize winner at XXXI International Violin Competition "Michelangelo Abbado" (Milan, Italy, 2014), 3rd prize winner at XXVIII  International Violin Competition "Valsesia Musica", section violin and orchestra (Varallo Sesia, Italy, 2012).

-Fabrizio Haim Cipriani, a writer, theologian, and violinist specializing in the baroque and classical repertoire.

Prizes and awards 
He won the violin competition "Vittorio Veneto" in 1970, Italy.

References

External links 
Mario Trabucco ed il Cannone
Trabucco in un articolo di Rai Radio 5 Classica
I violini Il Cannone e Il Sivori in una descrizione a cura del Comune di Genova

Italian violinists
Male violinists
20th-century violinists
21st-century violinists
20th-century classical musicians
Year of birth missing (living people)
Living people
20th-century Italian male musicians
21st-century Italian male musicians